Kamarudeen Usman (born May 11, 1987) is an American and Nigerian professional mixed martial artist, former freestyle wrestler and retired folkstyle wrestler. He currently competes in the welterweight division of the Ultimate Fighting Championship (UFC), where he is the former UFC Welterweight Champion and was also The Ultimate Fighter 21 tournament winner. 
As of November 14, 2022, he is #1 in the UFC men's welterweight rankings, and as of March 7, 2023, he is #5 in the UFC men's pound-for-pound rankings.

Background
Usman was born in Auchi, Nigeria. His father was a major in the Nigerian Army and his mother was a teacher. He has two brothers, Kashetu and Mohammed, the latter of whom is also a mixed martial artist and fellow The Ultimate Fighter (TUF) winner. Usman had a modest upbringing during his childhood. Usman's father Muhammed Nasiru Usman, who became a pharmacist in the United States, brought his family into the country when Usman was eight years old, immigrating to Dallas, Texas.

Wrestling career 
Usman started wrestling in his sophomore year in high school, at Bowie High School in Arlington, Texas. Because Usman's wrestling coach at the time had trouble pronouncing his first name Kamarudeen, he got the nickname "Marty" when he joined the team and it stuck with him during his amateur wrestling career. After compiling a 53–3 record as a senior and placing third at the Texas state championships, Usman wrestled alongside Jon Jones at the senior national tournament before leaving for college.

In college, Usman wrestled in Iowa at William Penn University for one year, where he was an NAIA national tournament qualifier in 2007, but was unable to attend the tournament due to a snowstorm; half of his team and his head coach, however, left early for the tournament without him, which frustrated Usman and influenced him to leave William Penn. He later transferred to the University of Nebraska at Kearney (UNK), which previously tried to recruit him under advisement of then-UNK wrestler Tervel Dlagnev, and subsequently helped the Lopers win their first-ever team title in 2008. Usman placed top three in the nation all three years he attended UNK and was a two-time national finalist. He became the NCAA Division II national champion at 174 pounds in 2010, finishing the season with a 44–1 record and 30 straight wins.

Shortly after his folkstyle career was over, Usman turned his attention to freestyle wrestling and became a resident of the United States Olympic Training Center, with hopes of making the 2012 Olympic team. Despite making the U.S. University World Team in 2010, Usman was sidetracked by injuries and eventually abandoned his Olympic goal after failing to qualify for the 2012 U.S. Olympic Team Trials, turning his attention to mixed martial arts instead. Former National Football League (NFL) star Christian Okoye, who has the nickname "The Nigerian Nightmare" trademarked, gave his blessing for Usman to use it.

Mixed martial arts career

Professional MMA career
In 2011, Usman served as the wrestling coach for Team Miller in The Ultimate Fighter season fourteen. After failing to qualify for the 2012 US Olympic Team Trials in freestyle wrestling, Usman made his professional MMA debut in November 2012. He compiled a record of 5–1, competing for several regional promotions before trying out for The Ultimate Fighter in early 2015.

The Ultimate Fighter
In February 2015, it was announced that Usman was one of the fighters selected to be on The Ultimate Fighter 21.

In his TUF debut and quarterfinal bout of the bracket, Usman faced undefeated eventual Titan FC Welterweight Champion Michael Graves. He won the fight via majority decision.

In the semifinals, Usman faced off against long-time veteran and former WSOF Welterweight Champion Steve Carl. He won the fight via unanimous decision and advanced to the finals.

In the finals, Usman faced Hayder Hassan on July 12, 2015, at The Ultimate Fighter 21 Finale. He won the bout via submission in the second round, thus winning a six-figure contract with the UFC. He was also awarded the Performance of the Night award.

Ultimate Fighting Championship

2015
In his official debut as a UFC athlete, Usman faced future champion Leon Edwards on December 19, 2015, at UFC on Fox 17. He won the fight by unanimous decision.

2016
Usman was expected to face two-time World Jiu-Jitsu Champion Sérgio Moraes on May 14, 2016, at UFC 198. However, it was announced on May 1 that Usman had pulled out of the bout for undisclosed reasons and was replaced by promotional newcomer Luan Chagas.

In his first bout of the year, Usman faced Alexander Yakovlev on July 23, 2016, at UFC on Fox 20. He won the one-sided fight via unanimous decision after out-grappling Yakovlev.

Usman faced TUF: Brazil 3 tournament winner Warlley Alves on November 19, 2016, at UFC Fight Night 100. He won the match by unanimous decision for the third-straight time.

2017
Usman faced former long-time KOTC Middleweight Champion Sean Strickland on April 8, 2017, at UFC 210. He once again won the fight via unanimous decision.

A rescheduled bout with a Sérgio Moraes on a seven-match unbeaten streak eventually took place on September 16, 2017, at UFC Fight Night 116. Usman won the fight via one-punch knockout in the first round.

Usman was scheduled to face Venator FC Welterweight Champion Emil Weber Meek on December 30, 2017, at UFC 219, however, Meek presented VISA problems and the pair was rescheduled for UFC Fight Night 124. Usman won the fight by unanimous decision after out-wrestling his opponent.

2018
Usman was expected to face Santiago Ponzinibbio on May 19, 2018, at UFC Fight Night 129. However, on April 21, Ponzinibbio was pulled from the card due to injury and replaced by ADCC Grappling World Champion and two-time UFC title challenger Demian Maia. After denying all of Maia's fifteen attempts of takedowns and out-performing his opponent on the feet, Usman won the fight via unanimous decision.

On August 18, it was announced that Usman would serve as a back-up for the UFC 228 main event match between long-time champion Tyron Woodley and undefeated challenger Darren Till.

Usman faced former UFC Lightweight Champion Rafael dos Anjos on November 30, 2018, at The Ultimate Fighter 28 Finale. He won the fight via unanimous decision. This win earned him his second Performance of the Night award.

UFC Welterweight Champion

2019
Riding a nine-fight winning streak in the UFC, Usman next faced UFC Welterweight Champion Tyron Woodley on March 2, 2019, in the co-main event at UFC 235. He won the one-sided fight via unanimous decision after dominating Woodley for five rounds.

Usman made his first title defense and faced long-time rival Colby Covington at UFC 245 on December 14, 2019. Despite both athletes being mostly offensive wrestlers, the fight did not include any grappling and contained high-paced offense in the striking instead. After a fight often referred to as a five-round "slugfest", Usman was able to knockdown his opponent twice before finishing him with strikes in the fifth round to be declared the winner via technical knockout, which set the record for the latest finish in UFC welterweight history. This fight earned both participants the Fight of the Night award.

2020
Usman was scheduled to defend his title for the second time against long-time teammate and two-time No-Gi Jiu-Jitsu World Champion Gilbert Burns on July 12, 2020 at UFC 251. Both being originally from the same camp – Sanford MMA – Usman opted to train under Trevor Wittman heading into the fight. On July 3, 2020, it was revealed that Burns tested positive for COVID-19 and he was subsequently removed from the card. On July 5, 2020, it was reported that Jorge Masvidal stepped in on short notice to replace Burns. Usman won via unanimous decision. The card reportedly generated 1.3 million pay-per-view buys in the United States, the most since UFC 229 in October 2018.

2021 
Usman was once again scheduled to defend his title against BJJ World Champion Gilbert Burns, on December 12, 2020, at UFC 256. However, on October 5, 2020, It was reported that Usman had pulled out from the bout, citing more time needed to recover from undisclosed injuries and the bout was postponed for February 13, 2021, as the headliner for UFC 258. Usman defended his title for the third time, as he won the fight via technical knockout in the third round, surpassing the record of the former UFC Welterweight Champion Georges St-Pierre for the largest win-streak in the division with thirteen. This win earned him the Performance of the Night award.

For his fifth title bout, Usman rematched against Jorge Masvidal for the UFC Welterweight Championship on April 24, 2021, at UFC 261 in Florida. He successfully defended his title after knocking out Masvidal in the second round, becoming the first to do so in the UFC. This win earned Usman his fourth Performance of the Night bonus award.

Usman rematched Colby Covington for the UFC Welterweight Championship on November 6, 2021 at UFC 268. Usman retained his championship, being declared the winner via unanimous decision.

2022 

Usman met Leon Edwards in a rematch of their 2015 fight, attempting to make his sixth title defense on August 20, 2022 at UFC 278. Usman entered the fight with a -425 winning favour while odd-makers saw Leon as a +315 underdog. Usman lost the fight and title via knockout late in the fifth round, marking Usman's first loss inside the UFC.

2023 
A third fight between Usman and Edwards took place on March 18, 2023, at UFC 286 for the UFC Welterweight Championship. He lost the bout via majority decision.

Personal life 
Born to a Muslim father and Christian mother, Usman identifies as a Muslim. His father, Muhammed Nasiru Usman, who had previous convictions in Tarrant County for theft and drunk driving, was convicted in May 2010 of  offenses including health care fraud and money laundering. He was sentenced to 15 years' imprisonment and ordered to pay $1,300,000 in restitution. He was released from FCI Seagoville on March 16, 2021.

Usman has a daughter who was born in 2014.

Usman has a younger brother named Mohammed who was also in The Ultimate Fighter, in the Heavyweight division, winning the UFC contract and becoming the first two brothers to do so.

Usman was a guest star in the film Black Panther: Wakanda Forever (2022),  playing a naval officer.

Championships and accomplishments

Folkstyle wrestling 
National Collegiate Athletic Association 
NCAA Division II National Championship (174 lbs, 2010)
NCAA Division II All-American (174 lbs, 2008, 2009, 2010)
National Association of Intercollegiate Athletics
NAIA National Qualifier (165 lbs, 2007)
University Interscholastic League
UIL All-State out of Bowie High School (145 lbs, 2005)
National Wrestling Coaches Association
Jim Koch Division II Hall of Fame, 2022 Class

Mixed martial arts 
Ultimate Fighting Championship
UFC Welterweight Championship (One time)
Five successful title defenses
 First Nigerian-born UFC champion 
The Ultimate Fighter 21 tournament winner
Performance of the Night (Four times) 
Fight of the Night (One time) 
Latest finish in UFC Welterweight history 
Latest knockout in UFC title fight history 
Most consecutive wins in UFC Welterweight history (15)
 Second most consecutive wins in UFC History (15)
Tied (with three fighters) for second most unanimous decision wins in UFC history (10)
2021 Fighter of the Year
2021 Knockout of the Year 
MMAJunkie.com
2019 December Fight of the Month 
2021 February Fight of the Month vs. Gilbert Burns
2021 April Knockout of the Month vs. Jorge Masvidal
World MMA Awards
2021 The Charles 'Mask' Lewis Fighter of the Year
MMA Fighting
2021 Fighter of the Year
2021 Knockout of the Year 
ESPN
2021 Male Fighter of the Year
MMA Mania
2021 Knockout of the Year 
Bleacher Report
2021 Fighter of the Year
Yahoo! Sports
2021 Fighter of the Year
Cageside Press
2021 Fighter of the Year
Lowkick MMA
2021 Fighter of the Year
CBS Sports
2021 Fighter of the Year
Combat Press
2021 Male Fighter of the Year
Wrestling Observer Newsletter
Mixed Martial Arts Most Valuable (2021)
Most Outstanding Fighter of the Year (2021)
BT Sport
2021 Male Fighter of the Year

Mixed martial arts record

|-
|Loss
|align=center|20–3
|Leon Edwards
|Decision (majority)
|UFC 286
|
|align=center|5
|align=center|5:00
|London, England
|
|-
|Loss
|align=center|20–2
|Leon Edwards
|KO (head kick)
|UFC 278
|
|align=center|5
|align=center|4:04
|Salt Lake City, Utah, United States
|
|-
|Win
|align=center|20–1
|Colby Covington
|Decision (unanimous)
|UFC 268
|
|align=center|5
|align=center|5:00
|New York City, New York, United States
|
|-
|Win
|align=center|19–1
|Jorge Masvidal
|KO (punch)
|UFC 261 
|
|align=center|2
|align=center|1:02
|Jacksonville, Florida, United States
|
|-
|Win
|align=center|18–1
|Gilbert Burns
|TKO (punches)
|UFC 258 
|
|align=center|3
|align=center|0:34
|Las Vegas, Nevada, United States
|
|-
|Win
|align=center|17–1
|Jorge Masvidal
|Decision (unanimous)
|UFC 251 
|
|align=center|5
|align=center|5:00
|Abu Dhabi, United Arab Emirates
|
|-
|Win
|align=center|16–1
|Colby Covington
|TKO (punches)
|UFC 245 
|
|align=center|5
|align=center|4:10
|Las Vegas, Nevada, United States
|
|-
|Win
|align=center|15–1
|Tyron Woodley
|Decision (unanimous)
|UFC 235
|
|align=center|5
|align=center|5:00
|Las Vegas, Nevada, United States
|
|-
|Win
|align=center|14–1
|Rafael dos Anjos
|Decision (unanimous)
|The Ultimate Fighter: Heavy Hitters Finale
|
|align=center|5
|align=center|5:00
|Las Vegas, Nevada, United States
|
|-
|Win
|align=center|13–1
|Demian Maia
|Decision (unanimous)
|UFC Fight Night: Maia vs. Usman
|
|align=center|5
|align=center|5:00
|Santiago, Chile
|
|-
|Win
|align=center|12–1
|Emil Weber Meek
|Decision (unanimous)
|UFC Fight Night: Stephens vs. Choi
|
|align=center|3
|align=center|5:00
|St. Louis, Missouri, United States
|
|-
|Win
|align=center|11–1
|Sérgio Moraes
|KO (punch)
|UFC Fight Night: Rockhold vs. Branch
|
|align=center|1
|align=center|2:48
|Pittsburgh, Pennsylvania, United States
|
|-
|Win
|align=center|10–1
|Sean Strickland
|Decision (unanimous)
|UFC 210
|
|align=center|3
|align=center|5:00
|Buffalo, New York, United States
|
|-
|Win
|align=center|9–1
|Warlley Alves
|Decision (unanimous)
|UFC Fight Night: Bader vs. Nogueira 2
|
|align=center|3
|align=center|5:00
|São Paulo, Brazil
| 
|-
|Win
|align=center|8–1
|Alexander Yakovlev
|Decision (unanimous)
|UFC on Fox: Holm vs. Shevchenko
|
|align=center|3
|align=center|5:00
|Chicago, Illinois, United States
|
|-
| Win
| align=center| 7–1
| Leon Edwards
| Decision (unanimous)
| UFC on Fox: dos Anjos vs. Cowboy 2
| 
| align=center| 3
| align=center| 5:00
| Orlando, Florida, United States
| 
|-
| Win
| align=center| 6–1
| Hayder Hassan
| Submission (arm-triangle choke)
| The Ultimate Fighter: American Top Team vs. Blackzilians Finale
| 
| align=center| 2
| align=center| 1:19
| Las Vegas, Nevada, United States
| 
|-
| Win
| align=center| 5–1
| Marcus Hicks
| TKO (punches)
| Legacy FC 33
| 
| align=center| 2
| align=center| 5:00
| Allen, Texas, United States
| 
|-
| Win
| align=center| 4–1
| Lenny Lovoto
| TKO (punches)
| Legacy FC 30
| 
| align=center| 3
| align=center| 1:04
| Albuquerque, New Mexico, United States
| 
|-
| Win
| align=center| 3–1
| Steven Rodriguez
| TKO (punches)
| Legacy FC 27
| 
| align=center| 1
| align=center| 1:31
| Houston, Texas, United States
| 
|-
| Win
| align=center| 2–1
| Rashid Abdullah
| TKO (punches)
| VFC 41
| 
| align=center| 1
| align=center| 3:49
| Ralston, Nebraska, United States
| 
|-
| Loss
| align=center| 1–1
| Jose Caceres
| Submission (rear-naked choke)
| CFA 11
| 
| align=center| 1
| align=center| 3:47
| Coral Gables, Florida, United States
|
|-
| Win
| align=center| 1–0
| David Glover
| TKO (punches)
| RFA 5
| 
| align=center| 2
| align=center| 4:50
| Kearney, Nebraska, United States
| 

|-
|Win
|align=center|2–0
|Steve Carl
|Decision (unanimous)
|rowspan=2| The Ultimate Fighter: American Top Team vs. Blackzilians
| (airdate)
|align=center|2
|align=center|5:00
|rowspan=2|Boca Raton, Florida, United States
|
|-
|Win
|align=center|1–0
|Michael Graves
|Decision (majority)
| (airdate)
|align=center|2
|align=center|5:00
|
|-

Freestyle record 

! colspan="7"| Senior Freestyle Matches
|-
!  Res.
!  Record
!  Opponent
!  Score
!  Date
!  Event
!  Location
|-
! style=background:white colspan=7 |
|-
|Loss
|35–26
|align=left| Evan Brown
|style="font-size:88%"|1–3, 1–1
|style="font-size:88%" rowspan=3|March 31 – April 1, 2012
|style="font-size:88%" rowspan=3|2012 US Olympic Trials Qualifier
|style="text-align:left;font-size:88%;" rowspan=3|
 Cedar Falls, Iowa
|-
|Win
|35–25
|align=left| Ed Richmond
|style="font-size:88%"|Fall
|-
|Loss
|34–25
|align=left| Jake Herbert
|style="font-size:88%"|2–5, 1–5
|-
! style=background:white colspan=7 |
|-
|Loss
|34–24
|align=left| Narsingh Yadav
|style="font-size:88%"|1–2, 1–5
|style="font-size:88%" rowspan=6|February 2–4, 2012
|style="font-size:88%" rowspan=6|2012 Dave Schultz Memorial International Open
|style="text-align:left;font-size:88%;" rowspan=6|
 Colorado Springs, Colorado
|-
|Win
|34–23
|align=left| Evan Brown
|style="font-size:88%"|1–0, 1–0
|-
|Win
|33–23
|align=left| Valentin Sofiadi
|style="font-size:88%"|2–0, 2–0
|-
|Win
|32–23
|align=left| Alex Burk
|style="font-size:88%"|5–2, 2–1
|-
|Loss
|31–23
|align=left| Deron Winn 
|style="font-size:88%"|Fall
|-
|Win
|31–22
|align=left| Kurt Brenner
|style="font-size:88%"|0–8, 6–4, 2–0
|-
! style=background:white colspan=7 |
|-
|Loss
|30–22
|align=left| Bryce Hasseman
|style="font-size:88%"|0–1, 0–1
|style="font-size:88%" rowspan=7|December 3, 2011
|style="font-size:88%" rowspan=7|2011 US Olympic Trials Qualifier
|style="text-align:left;font-size:88%;" rowspan=7|
 Las Vegas, Nevada
|-
|Win
|30–21
|align=left| Travis Paulson
|style="font-size:88%"|INJ
|-
|Win
|29–21
|align=left| James Yonushonis
|style="font-size:88%"|4–2, 2–1
|-
|Win
|28–21
|align=left| Doug Umbehauer
|style="font-size:88%"|1–1, 2–0
|-
|Win
|27–21
|align=left| Kurt Brenner
|style="font-size:88%"|1–0, 5–2
|-
|Loss
|26–21
|align=left| Terry Madden 
|style="font-size:88%"|0–4, 1–4
|-
|Win
|26–20
|align=left| Pat Downey 
|style="font-size:88%"|1–1, 3–3, 4–0
|-
! style=background:white colspan=7 |
|-
|Loss
|25–20
|align=left| Kirk Smith
|style="font-size:88%"|1–1, 0–3
|style="font-size:88%" rowspan=3|November 11–13, 2011
|style="font-size:88%" rowspan=3|2011 NYAC Holiday International Open Tournament
|style="text-align:left;font-size:88%;" rowspan=3|
 New York City, New York
|-
|Win
|25–19
|align=left| Mike Tamillow
|style="font-size:88%"|2–1, 3–0
|-
|Loss
|24–19
|align=left| Jaime Espinal
|style="font-size:88%"|0–4, 4–6
|-
! style=background:white colspan=7 |
|-
|Loss
|24–18
|align=left| Mack Lewnes
|style="font-size:88%"|2–2, 0–6
|style="font-size:88%" rowspan=3|October 28–30, 2011
|style="font-size:88%" rowspan=3|2011 Sunkist Kids International Open Tournament
|style="text-align:left;font-size:88%;" rowspan=3|
 Mesa, Arizona
|-
|Loss
|24–17
|align=left| Raymond Jordan 
|style="font-size:88%"|0–4, 1–3
|-
|Win
|24–16
|align=left| Erich Schmidtke
|style="font-size:88%"|3–0, 1–2, 3–1
|-
! style=background:white colspan=7 |
|-
|Loss
|23–16
|align=left| Luke Lofthouse
|style="font-size:88%"|1–1, 4–1, 0–1
|style="font-size:88%" rowspan=2|May 12–14, 2011
|style="font-size:88%" rowspan=2|2011 Northern Plains Regional Championships
|style="text-align:left;font-size:88%;" rowspan=2|
 Waterloo, Iowa
|-
|Win
|23–15
|align=left| Mike Schmidt 
|style="font-size:88%"|3–3, 7–0, 7–2
|-
! style=background:white colspan=7 |
|-
|Win
|22–15
|align=left| Kevin Bailey
|style="font-size:88%"|TF 7–0, 6–0
|style="font-size:88%" rowspan=7|April 20–23, 2011
|style="font-size:88%" rowspan=7|2011 US University National Championships
|style="text-align:left;font-size:88%;" rowspan=7|
 Akron, Ohio
|-
|Loss
|21–15
|align=left| Max Thomusseit 
|style="font-size:88%"|3–1, 0–1, 0–1
|-
|Win
|21–14
|align=left| Ryan Loder 
|style="font-size:88%"|6–0, 1–3, 2–1
|-
|Win
|20–14
|align=left| Keith Witt 
|style="font-size:88%"|TF 6–0, 6–0
|-
|Win
|19–14
|align=left| Ben Bennett
|style="font-size:88%"|2–0, 6–0
|-
|Loss
|18–14
|align=left| Nick Heflin
|style="font-size:88%"|0–1, 1–3
|-
|Win
|18–13
|align=left| Cole Shafer
|style="font-size:88%"|6–0, 2–0
|-
! style=background:white colspan=7 |
|-
|Loss
|17–13
|align=left| Raymond Jordan
|style="font-size:88%"|0–2, 0–2
|style="font-size:88%" rowspan=7|April 7–10, 2011
|style="font-size:88%" rowspan=2|2011 US Open National Championships
|style="text-align:left;font-size:88%;" rowspan=7|
 Cleveland, Ohio
|-
|Loss
|17–12
|align=left| Bryce Hasseman
|style="font-size:88%"|1–1, 0–3
|-
|Win
|17–11
|align=left| Evan Brown
|style="font-size:88%"|0–1, 2–1, 1–0
|style="font-size:88%" rowspan=5|2011 US Open National Championships – Qualifier
|-
|Win
|16–11
|align=left| Christopher Honeycutt
|style="font-size:88%"|1–1, 2–3, 2–1
|-
|Win
|15–11
|align=left| Kaleb Young
|style="font-size:88%"|3–2, 1–0
|-
|Loss
|14–11
|align=left| Nick Heflin
|style="font-size:88%"|0–1, 4–1, 0–1
|-
|Win
|14–10
|align=left| Dwight Middleton
|style="font-size:88%"|TF 6–0, 6–0
|-
! style=background:white colspan=7 |
|-
|Loss
|13–10
|align=left| Jaime Espinal
|style="font-size:88%"|Fall
|style="font-size:88%" rowspan=5|February 2–5, 2011
|style="font-size:88%" rowspan=5|2011 Dave Schultz Memorial International Open
|style="text-align:left;font-size:88%;" rowspan=5|
 Colorado Springs, Colorado
|-
|Win
|13–9
|align=left| James Yonushonis
|style="font-size:88%"|TF 5–0, 8–2
|-
|Loss
|12–9
|align=left| Shinya Matsumoto
|style="font-size:88%"|2–4, 1–4
|-
|Win
|12–8
|align=left| Jake Landals 
|style="font-size:88%"|5–0, 7–0
|-
|Win
|11–8
|align=left| James Reynolds
|style="font-size:88%"|4–1, 7–0
|-
! style=background:white colspan=7 |
|-
|Loss
|10–8
|align=left| Raymond Jordan
|style="font-size:88%"|Fall
|style="font-size:88%" rowspan=5|November 20–21, 2010
|style="font-size:88%" rowspan=5|2010 NYAC International Open Tournament
|style="text-align:left;font-size:88%;" rowspan=5|
 New York City, New York
|-
|Win
|10–7
|align=left| Jason Lapham
|style="font-size:88%"|1–0, 3–0
|-
|Win
|9–7
|align=left| Robert Isley
|style="font-size:88%"|2–1, 4–2
|-
|Loss
|8–7
|align=left| Keith Gavin 
|style="font-size:88%"|1–0, 1–2, 0–2
|-
|Win
|8–6
|align=left| Vitaliy Horodnytskyy
|style="font-size:88%"|2–0, 2–1
|-
! style=background:white colspan=7 |
|-
|Loss
|7–6
|align=left| Giedrius Morkis
|style="font-size:88%"|Fall
|style="font-size:88%" rowspan=3|October 30, 2010
|style="font-size:88%" rowspan=3|2010 University World Championships
|style="text-align:left;font-size:88%;" rowspan=3|
 Torino, Italy
|-
|Loss
|7–5
|align=left| Piotr Ianulov
|style="font-size:88%"|0–6
|-
|Win
|7–4
|align=left| Alex Burk
|style="font-size:88%"|9–2
|-
! style=background:white colspan=7 |
|-
|Loss
|6–4
|align=left| Adam Hall
|style="font-size:88%"|2–0, 0–1, 2–4
|style="font-size:88%" rowspan=5|May 28–29, 2010
|style="font-size:88%" rowspan=5|2010 US University World Team Trials
|style="text-align:left;font-size:88%;" rowspan=5|
 Colorado Springs, Colorado
|-
|Win
|6–3
|align=left| Albert White
|style="font-size:88%"|2–1, 2–0
|-
|Loss
|5–3
|align=left| Jon Reader
|style="font-size:88%"|0–4, 1–5
|-
|Win
|5–2
|align=left| John Paul O`Connor
|style="font-size:88%"|0–3, 4–3, 5–0
|-
|Win
|4–2
|align=left| Matt Ballweg
|style="font-size:88%"|5–1, 6–0
|-
! style=background:white colspan=7 |
|-
|Loss
|3–2
|align=left| David Bonin
|style="font-size:88%"|1–2, 4–0, 3–3
|style="font-size:88%" rowspan=5|April 22–24, 2010
|style="font-size:88%" rowspan=2|2010 US Open National Championships
|style="text-align:left;font-size:88%;" rowspan=5|
 Cleveland, Ohio
|-
|Loss
|3–1
|align=left| Travis Paulson
|style="font-size:88%"|3–1, 0–1, 0–6
|-
|Win
|3–0
|align=left| Derek Peperas
|style="font-size:88%"|INJ
|style="font-size:88%" rowspan=3|2010 US Open National Championships – Qualifier
|-
|Win
|2–0
|align=left| David Foxen
|style="font-size:88%"|TF 6–0, 7–0
|-
|Win
|1–0
|align=left| Michael Mitchell
|style="font-size:88%"|3–5, 3–2, 6–0
|-

NCAA record

! colspan="8"| NCAA Division II Championships Matches
|-
!  Res.
!  Record
!  Opponent
!  Score
!  Date
!  Event
|-
! style=background:white colspan=6 |2010 NCAA (DII) Championships  at 174 lbs
|-
|Win
|11–2
|align=left|Luke Rynish
|style="font-size:88%"|5–4
|style="font-size:88%" rowspan=4|March 13, 2010
|style="font-size:88%" rowspan=4|2010 NCAA Division II Wrestling Championships
|-
|Win
|10–2
|align=left|Christopher Barrick
|style="font-size:88%"|6–5
|-
|Win
|9–2
|align=left|Aaron Denson
|style="font-size:88%"|2–0
|-
|Win
|8–2
|align=left|Ben Becker
|style="font-size:88%"|9–2
|-
! style=background:white colspan=6 |2009 NCAA (DII) Championships  at 174 lbs
|-
|Loss
|7–2
|align=left|Brett Hunter
|style="font-size:88%"|2–3
|style="font-size:88%" rowspan=4|March 14, 2009
|style="font-size:88%" rowspan=4|2009 NCAA Division II Wrestling Championships
|-
|Win
|7–1
|align=left|Ross Taplin
|style="font-size:88%"|2–0
|-
|Win
|6–1
|align=left|Jarret Hall
|style="font-size:88%"|4–2
|-
|Win
|5–1
|align=left|Luke Rynish
|style="font-size:88%"|8–5
|-
! style=background:white colspan=6 |2008 NCAA (DII) Championships  at 174 lbs
|-
|Win
|4–1
|align=left|Josh Shields
|style="font-size:88%"|3–2
|style="font-size:88%" rowspan=5|March 15, 2008
|style="font-size:88%" rowspan=5|2008 NCAA Division II Wrestling Championships
|-
|Win
|3–1
|align=left|Chris Gibbs
|style="font-size:88%"|4–1
|-
|Loss
|2–1
|align=left|Albert Miles
|style="font-size:88%"|2–6
|-
|Win
|2–0
|align=left|Tyler Tubbs
|style="font-size:88%"|SV–1 7–5
|-
|Win
|1–0
|align=left|Chris Gibbs
|style="font-size:88%"|MD 10–0
|-

Pay-per-view bouts

See also
List of current UFC fighters
List of male mixed martial artists

References

External links
 
 

1987 births
American male mixed martial artists
American people of Yoruba descent
American practitioners of Brazilian jiu-jitsu
Living people
Mixed martial artists utilizing collegiate wrestling
Mixed martial artists utilizing freestyle wrestling
Mixed martial artists utilizing Brazilian jiu-jitsu
Nebraska–Kearney Lopers wrestlers
American male sport wrestlers
Nigerian male sport wrestlers
Nigerian emigrants to the United States
Nigerian male mixed martial artists
Nigerian practitioners of Brazilian jiu-jitsu
People awarded a black belt in Brazilian jiu-jitsu
People from Arlington, Texas
People from Auchi
Sportspeople from Arlington, Texas
Sportspeople from Benin City
Sportspeople from the Dallas–Fort Worth metroplex
The Ultimate Fighter winners
Ultimate Fighting Championship champions
Ultimate Fighting Championship male fighters
Welterweight mixed martial artists
Yoruba sportspeople